The 2005 Qatar motorcycle Grand Prix was the fourteenth round of the 2005 MotoGP Championship. It took place on the weekend of 29 September-1 October 2005 at the Losail International Circuit.

MotoGP classification

250 cc classification

125 cc classification

Championship standings after the race (motoGP)

Below are the standings for the top five riders and constructors after round fourteen has concluded.

Riders' Championship standings

Constructors' Championship standings

 Note: Only the top five positions are included for both sets of standings.

References

Qatar motorcycle Grand Prix
Qatar
Motorcycle Grand Prix